Sesehang Angadambe (born 3 November 2000) is a Nepalese professional footballer who plays as a midfielder for Martyr's Memorial A-Division League Tribhuvan Army Club  and the Nepal national team. He made his international national debut against Bangladesh on 17 November 2020 in Dhaka.

References

2000 births
Living people
Nepalese footballers
Nepal youth international footballers
Nepal international footballers
Association football midfielders
Nepal Super League players